The following lists events that happened during 1934 in New Zealand.

Population
 Estimated population as of 31 December: 1,558,400
 Increase since previous 31 December 1933: 11,300 (0.73%)
 Males per 100 females: 103.3

Incumbents

Regal and viceregal
Head of State – George V
Governor-General – The Lord Bledisloe GCMG KBE PC

Government
The 24th New Zealand Parliament continued with the coalition of the United Party and the Reform Party; which postponed the next general election from 1934 to 1935.

Speaker of the House – Charles Statham (Independent)
Prime Minister – George Forbes
Minister of Finance – Gordon Coates (Reform Party)
Minister of Foreign Affairs – George Forbes
Attorney-General – George Forbes
Chief Justice — Sir Michael Myers

Parliamentary opposition
 Leader of the Opposition –  Michael Joseph Savage (Labour Party).

Main centre leaders
Mayor of Auckland – George Hutchison
Mayor of Wellington – Thomas Hislop
Mayor of Christchurch – Dan Sullivan
Mayor of Dunedin – Edwin Thomas Cox

Events 
 6 February: Treaty house and grounds at Waitangi dedicated as a national reserve.
 5 March: Pahiatua is hit by an earthquake recording a magnitude of 7.6 at 11.46pm; see 1934 Pahiatua earthquake
 28 June: Third session of the 24th Parliament commences.
 10 November: Third session of the 24th Parliament concludes.
 Banknotes issued by the new Reserve Bank replace those issued by the Trading Banks, see New Zealand pound.
 The first official airmail flight from New Zealand to Australia by Faith in Australia; see Charles Ulm.

Arts and literature

See 1934 in art, 1934 in literature, :Category:1934 books

Music

See: 1934 in music

Radio
See: Public broadcasting in New Zealand

Film
See: :Category:1934 film awards, 1934 in film, List of New Zealand feature films, Cinema of New Zealand, :Category:1934 films

Sport

British Empire Games

Chess
 The 43rd National Chess Championship was held in Dunedin, and was won by J.B. Dunlop, of Dunedin, his fourth title.

Golf
 The 24th New Zealand Open championship was won by Andrew Shaw, his 6th title.
 The 38th National Amateur Championships were held in Wanganui
 Men: B. M. Silk (Wanganui)
 Women: Miss B. Gaisford – her second title.

Horse racing

Harness racing
 New Zealand Trotting Cup – Indianapolis
 Auckland Trotting Cup – Roi L'Or

Lawn bowls
The national outdoor lawn bowls championships are held in Dunedin.
 Men's singles champion – W. Carswell (Taieri Bowling Club)
 Men's pair champions – J. McPherson, J. Veitch (skip) (West Harbour Bowling Club)
 Men's fours champions – G. Dickson, F. Redpath, H.F. Gibson, H. Wilson (skip) (Linwood Bowling Club)

Rugby
:Category:Rugby union in New Zealand, :Category:All Blacks
 the Bledisloe Cup was won by Australia, with one win and one draw.
 The Ranfurly Shield changed hands twice: Canterbury lost their first defence to Hawkes Bay 0–9. Hawkes Bay defended the shield against Wanganui 39–16 and Taranaki 23–8 before losing it to Auckland 14–18.

Rugby league
New Zealand national rugby league team

Soccer
 The Chatham Cup is won by Auckland Thistle who beat Christchurch Thistle 2–1 in the final.
 Provincial league champions:
	Auckland:	Thistle
	Canterbury:	Thistle
	Hawke's Bay:	Napier YMCA
	Nelson:	YMCA
	Otago:	King Edward Technical College Old Boys
	Southland:	Southern
	Taranaki:	Stratford
	Waikato:	Huntly Starr Utd
	Wanganui:	Thistle
	Wellington:	Marist

Births

January
 3 January – Bob Elliott, paediatrician (died 2020)
 6 January – Harry M. Miller, entertainment promoter and publicist (died 2018)
 11 January – Barrie West, naval officer
 22 January – Graham Kerr, television cook
 26 January – Rex Percy, rugby union and rugby league player (died 2015)

February
 4 February – Donal Smith, athlete
 6 February – Barry Magee, athlete
 7 February – Ossie Butt, rugby league player (died 2002)
 10 February – Fleur Adcock, poet and editor

March
 3 March – Lindsay Townsend, rugby union player (died 2020)
 15 March – Wally Hughes, association football player and coach (died 2011)
 16 March
 Ian McLean, politician
 Des Townson, yacht designer (died 2008)
 17 March – Ian Barker, jurist (died 2022)
 20 March
 Graeme Hansen, equestrian (died 2007)
 Ralph Maxwell, politician (died 2012)
 26 March
 Harle Freeman-Greene, diplomat
 Matiu Rata, politician (died 1997)
 31 March – Randall Carrington, cricketer (died 2018)

April
 3 April – Pamela Allen, children's writer and illustrator
 9 April – Bill Birch, politician
 14 April – Duncan MacRae, rugby league player (died 2019)
 21 April – Martin Horton, cricket player and coach (died 2011)
 30 April – Tom Coughlan, rugby union player (died 2017)

May
 1 May
 Nev MacEwan, rugby union player
 Apirana Mahuika, Ngāti Porou leader (died 2015)
 8 May
 Graeme Lowans, cricketer (died 2014)
 Gordon Ogilvie, historian and biographer (died 2017)
 12 May – Peter Bland, poet, actor
 15 May – Frank McAtamney, rugby union player (died 2022)
 16 May – Roy Kerr, mathematician
 21 May – Guy Henderson, oboist (died 2013)
 28 May – Bill Baillie, athlete (died 2018)
 30 May
 Mel Cooke, rugby league player (died 2013)
 Peter Dronke, medievalist (died 2020)

June
 5 June
 Ashley Lawrence, conductor (died 1990)
 Margaret Stuart, athlete (died 1999)
 8 June – David Abbott, cricket umpire (died 2016)
 11 June – John da Silva, wrestler, boxer (died 2021)
 13 June – Mel Brieseman, public health official, missionary (died 2010)
 19 June – Arthur Candy, cyclist (died 2019)

July
 12 July – Tuna Scanlan, boxer (died 2014)
 15 July – Noel Hobson, field hockey player
 19 July – Tessa Birnie, concert pianist (died 2008)
 22 July
 Sam Chaffey, alpine skier, businessman (died 1998)
 Neville Denton, rugby league player and coach (died 2015)
 25 July – Peter Skelton, cricketer (died 2009)
 27 July – Robin Leamy, Roman Catholic bishop (died 2022)
 31 July – Roger Urbahn, rugby union player, cricketer, sports journalist (died 1984)

August
 1 August – John Beck, cricketer (died 2000)
 6 August – Dave Gillespie, rugby union player
 9 August – Kevin Laidlaw, rugby union player
 21 August – Ruth Butterworth, political scientist (died 2020)
 24 August
 Tony Campbell, biblical scholar (died 2020)
 John Waddingham, cricketer
 29 August – John Guy, cricketer

September
 2 September
 Leslie Butler, cricketer (died 2006)
 Colin Knight, educationalist (died 2016)
 6 September – Alison Roxburgh, women's rights advocate, community leader (died 2020)
 8 September – Ross Brown, rugby union player (died 2014)
 9 September
 Eugene Paykel, psychiatrist
 John Wallace, jurist (died 2012)
 Roy Williams, decathlete
 10 September
 John Abrams, field hockey player
 Des Webb, rugby union player (died 1987)
 11 September – Evon Dickson, cricketer (died 2012)
 14 September – Paul Little, rugby union player (died 1993)
 19 September – Austin Mitchell, journalist, politician (died 2021)
 25 September – Allan Potts, athlete, athletics coach and administrator (died 2014)
 28 September – Mike Bungay, lawyer
 29 September – Bob Parker, rower (died 2009)

October
 1 October – Teupoko'ina Utanga Morgan, teacher, politician, author (died 2007)
 4 October – Joe Williams, physician, politician (died 2020)
 8 October – Jean Coulston, cricketer (died 2001)
 12 October – Maurice Langdon, cricketer
 18 October – Allan Wilson, biochemist (died 1991)
 20 October – Leo Close, Paralympic sportsman and sports organiser (died 1977)
 22 October – Donald McIntyre, opera singer
 28 October – Brian Davis, Anglican archbishop (died 1998)
 29 October – George Cuthill, association footballer
 31 October – Don Aickin, obstetrician and gynaecologist (died 2019)

November
 1 November – Les Mills, athlete, politician
 11 November – Peter Snow, physician (died 2006)
 12 November – Peter Wilkinson, politician (died 1987)
 13 November – Peter Arnett, TV journalist, Pulitzer Prize winner

December
 1 December – Peter Williams, lawyer, penal reform advocate (died 2015)
 6 December – Johnny Hanks, boxer (died 2013)
 11 December
 Tom Hadfield, rugby league player (died 2018)
 Ross McNabb, mycologist (died 1972)
 25 December – John Shrapnell, journalist, actor, singer (died 2020)
 26 December – Don Hunn, diplomat and public servant
 27 December – Ron Ackland, rugby league player and coach (died 2013)
 28 December – Bob Skelton, jockey (died 2016)
 30 December
 Barry Briggs, speedway rider
 Eddie Tonks, rugby union administrator (died 2020)

Undated
 Gillian Cowlishaw, anthropologist
 James Flynn, intelligence researcher, politician (died 2020)
 Gil Hanly, artist
 Olaf Keil, musician
 Leo McKendry, politician
 Norma Restieaux, cardiologist
 Tepaeru Tereora, artist, Cook Islands Māori language advocate
 Ted Thomas, jurist
 Ann Verdcourt, potter (died 2022)

Deaths

January–February
 6 January – Hikapuhi, Ngāti Pikiao tohunga (born )
 7 January – Alfred West, rugby union player (born 1893)
 9 January – George Smailes, politician, clergyman (born 1862)
 10 January – Lawrence Grace, politician (born 1854)
 18 January – Jessie Aitken, community worker, political activist (born 1867)
 20 January – Joseph Lawton, cricket player and coach (born 1857)
 27 January – Spencer Gollan, rower, golfer (born 1860)
 31 January – Duncan Sommerville, mathematician and astronomer (born 1879)
 8 February– Herbert Izard, Anglican clergyman (born 1869)
 15 February – John Fletcher, businessman, politician (born 1888)
 22 February
 Rosetta Baume, feminist, community leader (born 1871)
 George Witters, conservationist (born 1876)

March–April
 5 March – Sir Arthur Dobson, surveyor, engineer, explorer (born 1841)
 12 March – Fanny Osborne, botanical illustrator (born 1852)
 31 March – James Mackintosh Bell, geologist, writer (born 1877)
 5 April – Thomas Davey, politician (born 1856)
 9 April – John Charles Thomson, politician (born 1866)
 11 April
 Harry Beswick, politician (born 1860)
 Sir Edwin Mitchelson, politician (born 1846)
 Alexander Peebles, politician (born 1856)
 29 April – Bert Pither, cyclist, aviation experimenter (born 1871)
 30 April – James Testro, cricketer (born 1851)

May–June
 5 May – Ann O'Donnell, hotel proprietor (born )
 6 May
 William McGirr, cricketer (born 1859)
 Sir Henry Wigram, businessman, politician, aviation pioneer (born 1857)
 14 May – George Fowler, cricketer (born 1860)
 26 May – John Anderson, rugby union player, engineer, politician (born 1849)
 2 June – David Ashby, cricketer (born 1852)
 7 June
 William Vorrath, cricketer, rugby league player (born 1904)
 George Webbe, cricketer (born 1856)
 9 June – John Joseph Woods, composer of "God Defend New Zealand" (born 1849)
 13 June – Guy Thornton, army chaplain (born 1872)
 14 June – Walter Empson, schoolteacher (born 1856)
 15 July – George Anson, cricketer, physician (born 1850)
 17 June – William Triggs, journalist, newspaper editor, politician (born 1855)
 27 June – Harry Ell, politician, conservationist (born 1862)

July–August
 1 July – Frederick William Ward, journalist and newspaper editor (born 1847)
 2 July – Arthur Plugge, army officer (born 1877)
 6 July – Thomas Pettit, businessman, politician (born 1858)
 8 July – Leonard Cockayne, botanist (born 1855)
 10 July – Andrew Walker, politician (born 1855)
 13 July – Kate Sheppard, suffragist (born 1848)
 16 July
 Walter Bennett, politician (born 1864)
 Carlo Bergamini, sculptor (born 1868)
 18 July – Herbert Fenwick, cricketer (born 1861)
 20 July – William Alfred Bayly, convicted murderer (born 1906)
 3 August – Allan Johnson, Anglican clergyman (born 1871)
 10 August – Sally Low, social reformer and peace campaigner (born 1876)
 11 August – William Collins, surgeon, politician, rugby union player, cricketer (born 1853)
 12 August – James Glasgow, cricketer (born 1934)
 17 August – Sir George Fowlds, politician (born 1860)

September–October
 2 September – James Allan, rugby union player (born 1860)
 4 September – Tini Taiaroa, community worker (born )
 5 September – John Joseph Dougall, politician (born 1860)
 13 September – Sir John Roberts, businessman, politician (born 1845)
 14 September – Robert Loughnan, journalist, politician (born 1841)
 21 September – Hugh Stewart, soldier, historian (born 1884)
 30 September – Joseph Butler, timber merchant (born 1862)
 9 October – Roderick McKenzie, politician (born 1852)
 20 October – Arthur Blacklock, cricketer (born 1868)

November–December
 2 November – Alexander Don, Presbyterian missionary (born 1857)
 8 November – Arthur Eastwood, jockey, rowing coxswain (born 1905)
 19 November – Charles Wilson, politician (born 1862)
 25 November – Eliza Anscombe, painter (born 1872)
 2 December – Horace Packe, Anglican clergyman (born 1865)
 8 December – Robert Brown, cricketer (born 1850)
 10 December – Margaret Stoddart, botanical artist (born 1865)
 22 December – Robert Davenport, cricketer (born 1852)
 29 December – Sir Arthur Fell, politician (born 1850)

See also
History of New Zealand
List of years in New Zealand
Military history of New Zealand
Timeline of New Zealand history
Timeline of New Zealand's links with Antarctica
Timeline of the New Zealand environment

References

External links

 
Years of the 20th century in New Zealand